John Kenneth Truss (born April 1947) is a mathematician and emeritus professor of pure mathematics at the University of Leeds where he specialises in mathematical logic, infinite permutation groups, homogeneous structures and model theory. Truss began his career as a junior research fellow at the University of Oxford before holding a series of academic positions and lastly joining the University of Leeds. He has written books on discrete mathematics (1991) and mathematical analysis (1997) and was co-editor in chief of the Journal of the London Mathematical Society until June 2003. He is the father of the former Prime Minister of the United Kingdom, Liz Truss.

Early life and family
John Truss was born in April 1947. He graduated from King's College, Cambridge in 1968 and earned his PhD at the University of Leeds in 1973 for a dissertation titled "Some Results about Cardinal Numbers without the Axiom of Choice" which was supervised by Frank Drake. In 1969, he married Priscilla Mary Grasby, a nurse, who he had met while they were students at Cambridge. Together, they have a daughter, Liz Truss, and three sons. Liz Truss has described her parents' politics as "to the left of Labour". Truss and his wife were both supporters of the Campaign for Nuclear Disarmament. They divorced in 2003.

Career
Truss's first academic position was as a junior research fellow at the Mathematical Institute of the University of Oxford. He then taught at a school in Kidderminster, Worcestershire, before lecturing at Paisley College of Technology from 1979 to 1985. In 1987, he worked at Simon Fraser University in British Columbia, Canada, and later at the University of Leeds where in 1988 with Frank Drake he edited the collected papers of Logic Colloquium '86, held at the University of Hull in 1986.

In 1990, Peter Cameron paid tribute to Truss in his notes on Oligomorphic Permutation Groups in the London Mathematical Society Lecture Notes Series No. 152, for saving him from "making some rash conjectures (by disproving them)", and "notably" for his contribution to the question of what are the possible cycle structures of automorphisms of M? In 1991, Truss published Discrete Mathematics for Computer Scientists which John Bayliss described in The Mathematical Gazette as "masterful and thorough" and getting "rapidly to the heart of some very exciting topics" but felt that it was more of a mathematician's book than a book for computer scientists as claimed by the author. Nonethless, Bayliss felt that the approach taken by Truss in organising and presenting his material was highly successful in condensing different strands of mathematics so that the author had shown that "discrete mathematics has come of age and is no longer a collection of disparate topics."

In 1999, Truss and S. Barry Cooper, also of the University of Leeds, jointly edited two volumes of papers in the London Mathematical Society Lecture Notes Series arising from the European meeting of the Association for Symbolic Logic in Leeds in July 1997 on sets and proofs and models and computability. The volumes were welcomed by philosopher Graham Priest of the University of Queensland who noted that they concentrated on logic as practiced in mathematics departments with little content of a philosophical or computer science nature, but, possibly as a result, were more coherent than usual for collections of conference papers. By then, Truss and Jonathan Partington were co-editors of the Journal of the London Mathematical Society. They were succeeded on 6 June 2003 by Francis Burstall and John Toland.

In 2014, Sam Tarzi's Multicoloured Random Graphs: Constructions and Symmetry, prepared with Peter Cameron, made extensive use of Truss's research, noting that Truss had proved that countable universal edge-coloured graphs have simple automorphism groups. A summary of Truss's work in this area was included as appendix A(8) of Tarzi's work.

Selected publications

Books

Edited volumes

Journal articles

References

External links
J. K. Truss's profile on ResearchGate
Personal website.
John Truss lecturing on homogeneous lattices at the Banff International Research Station for Mathematical Innovation and Discovery.

Living people
20th-century English mathematicians
Academics of the University of Leeds
21st-century English mathematicians
Alumni of King's College, Cambridge
Academic staff of Simon Fraser University
Truss family
Parents of prime ministers of the United Kingdom
Academics of the University of the West of Scotland
Alumni of the University of Leeds
1947 births
Campaign for Nuclear Disarmament activists